The Stix is the third studio album by the Norwegian band Jaga Jazzist. It was released on 6 May 2003 by Ninja Tune to positive reviews.

Recording 
 All songs produced by Jørgen Træen.
 Recorded by Jørgen Træen in Duper, summer 2001 and in Waterfall Studio, spring 2002.
 Mixed by Jørgen Træen with Lars Hornveth, Martin Horntveth and Andreas Mjøs in Duper, summer 2002.
 Mastered by Ingar Hunskaar at Strype Audio.
 Graphic design by Kim Hiorthøy.

Personnel 
 Harald Frøland – guitar, FX, synthesizer
 Andreas Mjøs – vibraphone, Omnichord, keyboards
 Martin Horntveth – drums, synth-drums, drum-machines, keyboards
 Jørgen Munkeby – flute, clarinet, harmonica, glockenspiel, keyboards
 Line Horntveth – tuba, melodica
 Lars Horntveth – tenor & baryton saxophone, flute, clarinet, bass clarinette, acoustic & electric guitars, keyboards
 Even Ormestad – bass, keyboards
 Lars Wabø – trombone
 Mathias Eick – trumpet, double bass, percussion, keyboards
 Morten Qvenild – synthesizer, piano, cassette tape-recorder

Additional personnel

 Jørgen Træen – electronics, drum programming
 Silje Haugan – violin
 Kjell Åge Stoveland – viola

Track listing 
All songs performed and arranged by Jaga Jazzist with Jørgen Træen.

References

External links 
 The Stix at Prog Archives

2003 albums
Jaga Jazzist albums
Ninja Tune albums